Brendan Arthur Folmar (born April 2, 1964) is a former American football quarterback who played three seasons with the Pittsburgh Gladiators of the Arena Football League. He played college football at California University of Pennsylvania and attended California High School in Coal Center, Pennsylvania. He was also a member of the Detroit Lions of the National Football League. Folmar was inducted into the California University of Pennsylvania Athletics Hall of Fame in 2001.

References

External links
Just Sports Stats

Living people
1964 births
Players of American football from Birmingham, Alabama
American football quarterbacks
California Vulcans football players
Pittsburgh Gladiators players
Detroit Lions players
National Football League replacement players